The 2023 T1 League All-Star Game was an exhibition game played on February 28, 2023, during the T1 League's 2022–23 season. It was the 1st edition of the T1 League All-Star Game, and was played at Taipei Heping Basketball Gymnasium.

Team Infinity defeated Team Beyond 179–124. Dwight Howard, who scored 37 points, was named the All-Star Game MVP.

All-Star Game

Coaches 
Following the conclusion of the regular season on February 5, 2023, the head coaches were decided. The head coaches of the first and second place in 2022–23 season were qualified as the head coaches of the All-Star Game. The All-Star Game head coaches were announced on February 6. Lee Yi-Hua, head coach of the New Taipei CTBC DEA, qualified as the head coach of the Team Beyond. Brendan Joyce, head coach of the Kaohsiung Aquas, qualified as the head coach of the Team Infinity.

Rosters 
The team decision was determined by the players' zodiac signs. The players with air or fire sign joined to Team Infinity, and the players with water or earth sign joined to Team Beyond. The rosters for the All-Star Game were selected through a voting process by the fans, head coaches of six teams, and media. Fans made up 60% of the vote, and head coaches and media comprised 40% of the vote. The five backcourt players, three frontcourt players, and five import players who received the highest cumulative vote totals were chosen the All-Star rosters. And the two backcourt players, one frontcourt player, and two import players with highest cumulative vote totals were named the All-Star starters. The players with highest votes of each team were awarded the All-Star Game Most Famous Player.

The All-Star Game rosters were announced on February 1, 2023. Dwight Howard and Mohammad Al Bachir Gadiaga were awarded the All-Star Game Most Famous Player. Chiang Yu-An of the TaiwanBeer HeroBears and Ku Mao Wei-Chia of the Tainan TSG GhostHawks were named the backcourt starters in the Team Infinity. Dwight Howard of the Taoyuan Leopards and Mindaugas Kupšas of the Kaohsiung Aquas were named the import starters in the Team Infinity. Joining the Team Infinity frontcourt starter was Lee Chi-Wei of the TaiwanBeer HeroBears.

Lin Wei-Han of the New Taipei CTBC DEA and Hsieh Ya-Hsuan of the New Taipei CTBC DEA were named the backcourt starters in the Team Beyond. Jason Brickman of the Kaohsiung Aquas and Robert Upshaw of the Tainan TSG GhostHawks were named the import starters in the Team Beyond. Joining the Team Beyond frontcourt starter was Mohammad Al Bachir Gadiaga of the New Taipei CTBC DEA.

After injury was reported from Lin Jen-Hung, the T1 League announced that Yu Chun-An of the Kaohsiung Aquas would replace him as participant in the All-Star Game on February 20.

 Notes
Bold indicates leading vote-getters per team

 Lin Jen-Hung was unable to play due to injury.
 Yu Chun-An was selected as Lin Jen-Hung's replacement.

Rules 
In the All-Star Game, participants attempt to get as many points as possible during the first three 12-minute quarters. The fourth quarter is untimed. If one team meets or exceeds the target score (the score of the leading team in total scoring after three quarters plus 22 for representing the number of counties in Taiwan), this team will declare as the winner. There are no personal fouls limit. One team will receive the bonus free throw when the opposing team has accumulated five team fouls in a quarter. Each team can select up to two import players on the court in 1st and 4th quarter, and no import players limit in 2nd and 3rd quarter.

Game summary 
The target score in this game was 178, since Team Infinity was leading 156–99 at the end of the third quarter. Team Infinity defeated Team Beyond 179–124. Dwight Howard, who scored 37 points, was named the All-Star Game MVP.

Three-Point Contest 
The Three-Point Contest took place on February 28. The contestants were announced on February 3. Lu Kuan-Hsuan won his first T1 League Three-Point Contest champion by defeating Yu Huan-Ya, Hsieh Ya-Hsuan, and Lee Chi-Wei.

Rules 
In this contest, participants attempt to make as many three-point field goals as possible from five main shooting locations around the three-point line and two big shot zones behind the three-point line in 70 seconds. Ball racks are positioned at five main shooting locations. Four of the racks contain four Regular Balls (each worth one point) and one Money Ball (worth two points). The fifth rack contains five Money Balls and can be placed on any of the five spots of the player's choice. Each big shot zone contains one Big Three (worth three points). The perfect score will be 40 points with shooting 16 Regular Balls, 9 Money Balls, and 2 Big Threes. Players begin shooting from one corner of the court, and move from station to station along the three-point arc until they reach the other corner.

In the qualifying round, each player has a chance to score as many points as possible. The four players with the top scores advance to the final round. The extra qualifications to final round are added when players have same points in qualifying round. The final round is played in the same way as the qualifying round. In the case of a tie, multiple extra rounds of 30 seconds are played to determine the winner. Each player can choose three spots (12 Regular Balls and 3 Money Balls) to finish extra round.

Result

Slam Dunk Contest 
The Slam Dunk Contest took place on February 28. The contestants were announced on February 3. After personal reason was reported from Mohammad Al Bachir Gadiaga, the T1 League announced that Chang Wei-Hsiang of the Tainan TSG GhostHawks would replace him as participant in the Slam Dunk Contest on February 20. Liu Chun-Ting won his first T1 League Slam Dunk Contest champion by defeating Marlon Johnson.

Rules 
In this contest, participants have two chances to finish dunks. Players need to finish each dunk in 60 seconds. There are five professional judges to score each dunk. Every judge can score from 6 points to 10 points. After finishing second dunk, the audience will judge the player's performance. The perfect score will be 110 points (50 points for each dunk from judges' scores and 10 points from audience's average scores) with finishing 2 dunks.

In the qualifying round, each player has to score as many points as possible. The two players with the top scores advance to the final round. The final round is played in the same way as the qualifying round. In the case of a tie, multiple extra rounds are played to determine the winner. Each player has one chance to finish dunk in 30 seconds during extra round. The player's performance is only scored by professional judges in extra round.

Result 

 Notes

 Mohammad Al Bachir Gadiaga was unable to play due to personal reason.
 Chang Wei-Hsiang was selected as Mohammad Al Bachir Gadiaga's replacement.

References

External links 
 

T1 League All-Star Game
All-Star Game
2023 in Taiwanese sport
T1 League